Benjamin Bok (born 25 January 1995) is a Dutch chess grandmaster. He was awarded the title of Grandmaster by FIDE in 2014. 

Bok was born in Lelystad. He is currently attending Saint Louis University in Saint Louis, Missouri, where he studies Finance and plays on the intercollegiate chess team.

He streams regularly on Twitch.

Chess career 
He won the FIDE Open in the 2015 London Chess Classic scoring 8 points out of 9.

In 2016, he debuted for the Dutch national team at the 2016 Chess Olympiad in Baku, Azerbaijan.

In 2017, Bok represented the Netherlands at the 2017 European Team Championship on Crete.

At the Chess World Cup 2019 he defeated Ivan Saric in the first round and was eliminated by Alexander Grischuk in the second round.

As of November 2022, he is the 6th-ranked Dutch chess player, and 184th-ranked player in the world. At his peak, he was the 2nd-ranked Dutch chess player, and 50th-ranked in the world.

References

External links
 
  
 
 

1995 births
Living people
Chess grandmasters
Dutch chess players
People from Lelystad
Twitch (service) streamers
Sportspeople from Flevoland
21st-century Dutch people